Jean Badovici (6 January 1893 – 17 August 1956) was a French architect and architecture critic of Romanian origin, active in Paris.

Biography 

Born in Bucharest, Romania, Jean Badovici studied architecture in Paris after World War I. Since 1923 he edited the important French magazine for avantgarde architecture L'Architecture Vivante. Furthermore, he designed two buildings (residential houses for himself) in Vézelay (1924) and in Paris near Pont de Sèvres (1934). In Roquebrune-Cap-Martin he assisted Eileen Gray - they were lovers until 1932 - in designing and constructing a home for them, one of the important buildings of the International style, E-1027.

After World War II Badovici was involved in reconstructing and saving the architectural heritage of France  in a board called Bâtiments civils et palais nationaux et des monuments historiques. There he served as assistant to the chief architect Robert Édouard Camelot (1903–1992).

L’Architecture Vivante
Jean Badovici gained reputation not for constructing buildings but for analyzing and supporting avantgarde architecture. He was an influential critic and mentor of international modern architecture in France since he began editing the magazine L'architecture Vivante in 1923. He convinced the publisher Albert Morancé of the importance for such an avantgarde magazine which ran from 1923 till 1933. L’Architecture Vivante became immediately an influential mouthpiece of the International style (Bauhaus, Constructivism, De Stijl). Le Corbusier - a friend of Badovici - for instance became one of the architects whose ideals were frequently discussed in this magazine. Badovici cultivated relations to European avantgarde magazines like Wendingen (Netherlands) and Cahiers d’Art (France, founded in 1926) of his friend Christian Zervos.

Regularly each issue of L’Architecture Vivante presented a number of architects and their works but there were also some very few dealing with just one artist (Le Corbusier, Pierre Jeanneret and in 1929 Eileen Gray and her home E-1027).

Personal life 
He lived with his lover Eileen Gray, who was openly bisexual, in E 1027. Le Corbusier vandalized the wall by his drawing Three Women depicting Eileen and Jean together, even though he was not "granted full authorization". He didn't think of it as "an invasion, but as a gift." (From "Battle Lines"- Beatriz Colomina)

L’Architecture Vivante in libraries  

In the United States (excerpts):
 New York Public Library (each of the issues from 1923 - 1933 seems to be available)
 Library of Congress (some issues available and complete reprint edition (New York, 1975) available)
 Chicago Public Library (complete reprint edition (New York, 1975) available)
 San Francisco Public Library (complete reprint edition (New York, 1975) available)

In Europe (excerpts):
 Courtauld Institute, London (complete reprint edition (New York, 1975) available)
 Bayerische Staatsbibliothek, München (roundabout 9 issues)
 Bibliothèque nationale de France, Paris (some issues)
 Zentralinstitut für Kunstgeschichte, München (complete edition available)

Reeditions L’Architecture Vivante 

The issue concerning Eileen Gray / E.1027:
  Eileen Gray, Jean Badovici: E. 1027: Maison en bord de mer. In L’Architecture Vivante. Reedition Éd. Imbernon, Marseille 2006, .

The complete edition:
  L'Architecture vivante, Da Capo Press, New York, c 1975

References 

Architects from Bucharest
Romanian expatriates in France
1893 births
1956 deaths